Arthur Dawson may refer to:

Sir Arthur Trevor Dawson (1866–1931), English armaments manufacturer
Arthur Dawson (footballer, born 1882) (1882–1951), English footballer for Blackburn Rovers and Burnley
Arthur Dawson (footballer, born 1907) (1907–1985), English footballer for Nelson
Arthur Potts Dawson (born 1971), English chef